Salvatierra is a subcomarca of Guijuelo in the province of Salamanca, Castile and León, Spain.  It contains eight municipalities:
 Aldeavieja de Tormes
 Berrocal
 Fuenterroble
 Guijuelo
 Montejo
 Pedrosillo de los Aires
 Pizarral
 Salvatierra de Tormes

References 

Province of Salamanca
Comarcas of the Province of Salamanca